Pravasi Bharatiya Divas (English: Non-Resident Indian Day) is a celebratory day observed (starting in 2003) on 9 January by the Republic of India to mark the contribution of the overseas Indian community towards the development of India. The day commemorates the return of Mahatma Gandhi from South Africa to Mumbai on 9 January 1915.

Established in 2000, it is sponsored by the Ministry of External Affairs of the Government of India and the Federation of Indian Chambers of Commerce and Industry (FICCI), the Confederation of Indian Industries and the Ministry of Development of North Eastern Region. This celebratory event is held from the 8th to the 10th of January every other year in a selected city in India: a forum for issues concerning the Indian Diaspora is organised, and the Pravasi Bharatiya Samman awards are given.

In 2006, the concept of Overseas Citizen of India (OCI) was launched during the Pravasi Bharatiya Divas convention at Hyderabad on 9 January.

In 2014, Pravasi Bhartiya Divas was held in New Delhi and was attended by 1,500 delegates from 51 countries. President Pranab Mukherjee gave the Pravasi Bharatiya Samman Awards.

In 2013, 11th Pravasi Bharatiya Divas was held in Kochi from 7–9 January, where the Indo-Canada Chamber of Commerce (ICCC) is organising partner of the summit. The President of Mauritius, Rajkeswur Purryag, was the chief guest at the official inaugural session. Canadian Minister Jason Kenney became the first individual of non-Indian heritage to address the gathering.

The 12th Pravasi Bharatiya Divas was held during 7–9 January 2014 at Vigyan Bhawan, New Delhi. The Theme for this year was Engaging Diaspora: Connecting Across Generations.

The 13th Pravasi Bharatiya Divas was held during 7–9 January 2015 at Mahatma Mandir, Gandhinagar, Gujarat. The theme for this year was "Apna Bharat, Apna Gaurav".

The 14th Pravasi Bharatiya Divas, which was supposed to be held during 7–9 January 2016 at New Delhi, was cancelled under the MEA's decision to make the event biennial.

The 14th Pravasi Bharatiya Divas was held during 7–9 January 2017 at Bengaluru, Karnataka. The theme for this year was "Redefining engagement with the Indian diaspora".

The 15th Pravasi Bharatiya Divas was held during 6–7 January 2018 at Marina Bay Sands, Singapore.

The 16th Pravasi Bharatiya Divas was held during 21–23 January 2019 at Varanasi, India. The Prime Minister of Mauritius, Pravind Jugnauth, was the guest of honour.

The 17th Pravasi Bharatiya Diwas was held in Indore from 8-10 January

History

The decision to celebrate Pravasi Bharatiya Divas was taken in accordance with recommendations of the High Level Committee (HLC) on the Indian Diaspora set up by government of India under the chairmanship of L. M. Singhvi. The then Prime Minister of India, Shri Atal Bihari Vajpayee, received the report of the Committee at a public function at Vigyan Bhavan in New Delhi on 8 January 2002, and announced the "Pravasi Bharatiya Divas" (PBD) on 9 January 2002. The day was chosen to mark the return of Mahatma Gandhi from South Africa to India in 1915.

The occasion is marked by special programs to recognise the contributions of NRI/PIO individuals of exceptional merit, felicitate NRI/PIO individuals who have made exceptional contributions in their chosen field/profession (Pravasi Bharatiya Samman (Hindi: NRI/PIO Award)) and provide a forum to discuss issues and concerns of people of the diaspora. The event has been organised every year since 2003, and is sponsored by the Ministry of Overseas Indian Affairs and the CII (Confederation of Indian Industry), initially sponsored by FICCI.

The 8th Pravasi Bharatiya Divas took place on 7–9 January 2010 and was webcast live at the official Ministry of Overseas Indian Affairs website, also covered live on social media via live blogging and live tweeting at Pravasi Bharatiya Divas, an online platform powered by Kotak Mahindra Bank. An investment facilitation platform for overseas Indians, the Overseas Indians Facilitation Centre, was launched by India's Prime Minister, Manmohan Singh, with a view of strengthening ties with the diaspora for partnering in India's growth story on the occasion.

The 2012 Pravasi Bhartiya Divas was held from 7–9 January 2012.  The venue was Jaipur, Rajasthan. Chief Guest of this event was the Prime Minister of Trinidad and Tobago, Ms Kamla Persad-Bissessar.

The 2013 Pravasi Bhartiya Divas was held from 8–9 January 2013 in Kochi, Kerala. Chief Guest of this event was the President of Mauritius, Rajkeshwar Purryag.
The 2015 Pravasi Bharatiya Divas was held in Ahmedabad celebrating 100 years of Mahatma's return to India. Chief guest was Mr Donald Ramtar, President of Republic of Guyana. The theme for this was "Apna Bharat Apna Gaurav" "Connecting Generations".

Pravasi Bharatiya Divas (PBD), the annual event for the Indian diaspora, was canceled for 2016. The format of the event, which is held between 7 and 9 January, has been changed as announced by the minister of external affairs and overseas Indian affairs Sushma Swaraj, in October 2015.
As per the announcement, the event was being moved to different states every two years; a smaller event would be held in Delhi every alternate year.

In 2017, the Pravasi Bharatiya Divas was held from 7–9 January 2017 in Bengaluru. The theme of this edition was "Redefining Engagement with the Indian Diaspora". The Ministry of External Affairs, under the guidance of Prime Minister Narendra Modi, had used digital modes to reach out to Indians abroad. The campaign Digital India also played a major role in bringing the success to Pravasi Bhartiya Divas. The plenary session 'Leveraging Social Media for Diaspora Connect' held on 9 January 2017, at the Pravasi Bharatiya Divas looked at social media as a medium in connecting the Indian Diaspora.

Venues

The annual Pravasi Bharatiya Divas Program since 2003 has been organised in the following cities:

*The 14th PBD scheduled to be held in 2016 was cancelled.

Regional Pravasi Bharatiya Divas 
The Ministry of External Affairs organizes Regional Pravasi Bharatiya Divas (RPBD) periodically outside India to connect with the Indian Diaspora in specific regions, familiarize them with the policies and programmes of the Government, enable them to contribute to India's development and growth, and address their concerns.

10 RPBD events have been held till date, at the following places:

The 10th Regional Pravasi Bharatiya Divas (RPBD) Convention was organized in Singapore at Marina Bay Sands, on 6 & 7 January 2018. This was a special RPBD to celebrate the 25 years of strategic partnership between India and ASEAN. The theme of the 2018 PBD Convention is "Ancient Route, New Journey: Diaspora in the Dynamic India-ASEAN Partnership". Indian EAM Sushma Swaraj is the Guest of Honour, and Singapore's Deputy Prime Minister Teo Chee Hean also attended. Indian Road Transport and Highways Minister Nitin Gadkari and chief ministers of Andhra Pradesh and Assam, N Chandrababu Naidu and Sarbananda Sonowal respectively, also attended the event. Singapore's Trade and Industry Minister S Iswaran and Foreign Minister Vivian Balakrishnan also addressed over 2,500 delegates.

Sushma Swaraj Bhawan (Previously known as Pravasi Bharatiya Kendra)
A High-Level Committee on Indian Diaspora, headed by Shri L. M. Singhvi, had recommended in January 2002 that the Government must renew and strengthen linkages of overseas Indians to their place of origin and with each other. The committee recommended that a Pravasi Bharatiya Bhavan should be set up to emerge as the focal point for networking between India and its overseas Indian community; and as a suitable place which would commemorate the trials, tribulations, the evolution, and achievements of the Indian Diaspora.

Taking this recommendation forward in January 2004, at the second Pravasi Bhartiya Divas (PBD) organized in Delhi, then Prime Minister Shri Atal Bihari Vajpayee announced that the Government will set up the Pravasi Bhartiya Kendra in New Delhi.

The Foundation Stone of the Kendra was laid by the then P.M. Dr. Manmohan Singh at 9th PBD in January 2011. Ground Breaking was done by then Minister of Overseas Indian Affairs on 28.04.2011 and construction started in April 2013.

Contract for construction of Pravasi Bharatiya Kendra (PBK) was awarded to National Building Construction Corporation (NBCC) on turnkey basis.

Prime Minister Narendra Modi inaugurated Pravasi Bharatiya Kendra in New Delhi on Sunday on the occasion of Gandhi Jayanti. The centre was dedicated to the welfare of the Indian Diaspora.

At the inauguration, the prime minister said "We are inaugurating this Kendra on a significant day of 2nd October. Gandhi Ji had left India but the call of the nation brought him back." Pravasi Bharatiya Kendra located at the heart of the Capital in Plots No.15A, 15B and 15D, Dr. Rizal Marg, Chanakyapuri, New Delhi is a tribute to the overseas Indian community; and commemorates their migration to various parts of the world, the challenges they faced abroad, their achievements and contributions.

Over time, the Kendra is expected to develop into a hub of activities for sustainable, symbiotic and mutually rewarding economic, social and cultural engagement between India and its Diaspora. Activities, seminars, events, workshops pertaining to the Indian Diaspora are expected to be organized here.

The Museum in the Kendra will depict the history of migration of the overseas
Indian community; their experiences and contributions.
In the Kendra's state-of-the art auditorium, multi-purpose halls, Conference and seminar halls – workshops and conferences with overseas Indians and on issues pertaining to them would be organized on a regular basis. The Kendra will also house the autonomous bodies India Centre for Migration, a think-tank working on issues pertaining to Indian migrant workers and the India Development Foundation for Overseas Indians, a not-for-profit Trust promoting contributions to flagship programmes in India.
The Library in PBK is a valuable repository of material about the Indian Diaspora including books written by overseas Indians in different languages. With an emphasis on digital material, —the library will provide access to online journals and prestigious library resources.
Pravasi Bharatiya Kendra renamed Sushma Swaraj Bhawan as tribute to the late leader.

Logo 
In the year of 2016 when the event was decided to be held biannually the Ministry of External Affairs needed a new logo for Pravasi Bharatiya Divas Convention. It was crowdsourced through the MyGov portal in an open competition and the winner Debasish Sarkar was awarded in a Joint Press Conference of Ministry of External Affair and Karnataka Government and the new logo was inducted in the 14th Pravasi Bharatiya Divas. The philosophy behind the logo according to the creator was "the human chain depicts our brotherhood and strength across the world, 'Ashoka Chakra' along with the tricolour canopy showing the Worldwide contribution towards development on mankind and peaceful presence of 'Bharatiya' and 'Pravasi Bharatiya' all around the world".

See also
Overseas Indian Facilitation Centre
Pravasi Bharatiya Samman
Non-resident Indian (NRI)
Person of Indian Origin (PIO)
World Hindi Secretariat
Indian Arrival Day
Girmityas

References

External links

Networking community of PBD attendees
Pravasi Bhartiya Divas (Varanasi), Event Website
MyGov Pravsi Bharatiya Divas Logo Competition

Indian diaspora
Recurring events established in 2003
Hindi words and phrases
Annual events in India
January observances